In geometry, the elongated bipyramids are an infinite set of polyhedra, constructed by elongating an  bipyramid (by inserting an  prism between its congruent halves).

There are three elongated bipyramids that are Johnson solids:
 Elongated triangular bipyramid,
 Elongated square bipyramid, and
 Elongated pentagonal bipyramid.
Higher forms can be constructed with isosceles triangles.

Forms

See also 
 Gyroelongated bipyramid
 Gyroelongated pyramid
 Elongated pyramid
 Diminished trapezohedron

References
Norman W. Johnson, "Convex Solids with Regular Faces", Canadian Journal of Mathematics, 18, 1966, pages 169–200. Contains the original enumeration of the 92 solids and the conjecture that there are no others.
  The first proof that there are only 92 Johnson solids.

Pyramids and bipyramids